The 2017 FIVB Volleyball Men's U23 World Championship was the third and final edition of the international volleyball tournament and the world championship for men's national teams under the age of 23, organized by the sport's world governing body, FIVB. The tournament was held in Cairo, Egypt from 18 to 25 August 2017. 12 teams from the 5 confederations competed in the tournament.

Argentina defeated defending champions Russia 4–2 in the final to claim their first title in the competition. This marked Argentina's first ever world title at any age group. Cuba won the bronze medal outclassing Brazil 4–1. Germán Johansen from Argentina was elected the MVP.

After this tournament, FIVB declared that "As per decision of May 2019 FIVB Board of Administration, the U23 WCH has been abolished."

Qualification
The FIVB Sports Events Council revealed a proposal to streamline the number of teams participating in the Age Group World Championships.

Pools composition
Teams were seeded following the Serpentine system according to their FIVB U23 World Ranking as of January 2017. FIVB reserved the right to seed the hosts as head of pool A regardless of the U23 World Ranking. Rankings are shown in brackets except the hosts who ranked 10th.

Squads

Venues

Testing of new rules
The 2017 FIVB Men's U23 World Championship will be a testing ground for a new scoring scheme currently under review by the FIVB, which, if successful, could mark a historical turning point for volleyball – much as the introduction of the Rally Scoring System did in the late 1990s.

Matches in Cairo will be played to best-of-seven sets with each set to 15 points (with at least a two-point difference needed). Three ranking points will be awarded to teams winning 4–0, 4–1 or 4–2. Two points go the winner of a 4–3 match with one point for the loser. It is hoped that the new scoring system will reduce overall duration of matches, while making each set more attractive and exciting – much as tie-breaks are under the current regulations. The interval between sets is reduced to two minutes (from three). Teams will switch ends after the second set - and also, if needed, after sets 4, 5 and 6. In addition, there will be no technical timeouts – just two regular thirty-second timeouts per team per set.

The basic principles for the new scheme were tested for the first time in the Dutch League in the 2016–17 season. Further testing of the scheme will be conducted at the Women's U23 World Championship in Ljubljana. During and after the competition, players, coaches, referees and officials will be evaluating the new system through a questionnaire, while duration and scoring statistics will be gathered and analysed.

This is the second time that the Men's U23 World Championship serves as a testbed for new regulations. Matches of the inaugural edition in 2013 in Uberlândia were played to 21-point sets. In addition to the scoring system, a new serving regulation will be tried out in Cairo, with the server not allowed to land inside the court after a jump service.

The testing of the new rules has been received with criticism from the volleyball community.

Pool standing procedure
 Number of matches won
 Match points
 Sets ratio
 Points ratio
 Result of the last match between the tied teams

Match won 4–0, 4–1 or 4–2: 3 match points for the winner, 0 match points for the loser
Match won 4–3: 2 match points for the winner, 1 match point for the loser

Preliminary round
All times are Eastern European Time (UTC+02:00).

Pool A

|}

|}

Pool B

|}

|}

Final round
All times are Eastern European Time (UTC+02:00).

5th–8th places

5th–8th semifinals

|}

7th-place match

|}

5th-place match

|}

Final four

Semifinals

|}

3rd-place match

|}

Final

|}

Final standing

Awards

Most Valuable Player
 Germán Johansen
Best Setter
 Matías Sánchez
Best Outside Spikers
 Denis Bogdan
 Miguel Gutiérrez

Best Middle Blockers
 Ivan Iakovlev
 Matheus Santos
Best Opposite Spiker
 Hisham Ewais
Best Libero
 Rogério Filho

See also
2017 FIVB Volleyball Women's U23 World Championship

References

External links
Official website

FIVB Volleyball Men's U23 World Championship
FIVB Volleyball Men's U23 World Championship
International volleyball competitions hosted by Egypt
2017 in Egyptian sport
FIVB Volleyball Men's U23
Sports competitions in Cairo